Genica Athanasiou (3 January 1897 – 13 July 1966) was a Romanian-French stage and film actress.

Selected filmography
 Count Kostia (1925)
 Misdeal (1928)
 The Seashell and the Clergyman (1928)
 The Lighthouse Keepers (1929)
 Saint Joan the Maid (1929)
 Colomba (1933)
 The Count of Monte Cristo (1954)

References

Sources
 Laurence Meiffret, Génica Athanasiou (1897-1966). La Vie passionnée d'une actrice roumaine dans l'avant-garde parisienne / Viata pasionanta a unei actrice romana din avangarda pariziana, Bucarest, Muzeul National al Literaturii Romane, 2019.
 John T. Soister. Conrad Veidt on Screen: A Comprehensive Illustrated Filmography. McFarland, 2002.

External links

1897 births
1966 deaths
Romanian film actresses
Romanian silent film actresses
Romanian stage actresses
Actresses from Bucharest
Romanian emigrants to France